McLenaghan is a surname. Notable people with the surname include:

Nathaniel McLenaghan (1841–1912), Canadian merchant and political figure
Raymond McLenaghan (born 1939), Canadian theoretical physicist and mathematician

See also
McLenaghen
McLenahan